Coach Trip 12 was the twelfth series of Coach Trip in the United Kingdom. The series began airing on 2 March 2015 for 20 episodes, concluding on 27 March 2015.

It began on 2 March 2015, airing weekdays at 17:30 on Channel 4. The twelfth series saw Brendan Sheerin return as tour guide, as in all previous editions and Paul Donald continued as coach driver with MT09 MTT as the registration of the coach once again and Jackie Clune narrated the series. Filming took place between October and November 2014. The twelfth series lasted only 20 days.

Contestants

The Trip by Day

References

2015 British television seasons
Coach Trip series